Richard L. "Tick" Segerblom (born August 4, 1948) is an American attorney and politician serving as a member of the Clark County Commission from District E. First elected to the Nevada Assembly to represent Assembly District 9 in 2006, he was elected to the Nevada Senate in 2012 to represent Senate District 3.

Early life and education 
Segerblom is a fourth-generation Nevada representative. His mother, Gene Segerblom, served in the Nevada Assembly from 1992 through 2000 and was a member of the Boulder City, Nevada City Council. His grandmother, Hazel Wines, served in the Nevada Assembly from 1934 to 1936, representing Humboldt County.

Segerblom earned a Bachelor of Arts degree from Pomona College and a Juris Doctor from the Sturm College of Law at the University of Denver.

Career 
As a Clark County commissioner, Segerblom represents District E which includes a part of the City of Las Vegas in downtown as well as East Las Vegas. As a senator, Segerblom represented Senate District 3 which encompasses a portion of urban Clark County including portions of the City of Las Vegas, the historic Alta Drive, Spanish Oaks, Scotch 80s, and the Charleston Heights neighborhoods and portions of Chinatown. Areas of interest include Lorenzi Park, the Meadows Mall, the Las Vegas Springs Preserve, the College of Southern Nevada, the Rawson-Neal Psychiatric Hospital and the World Market Center Las Vegas, Symphony Park including Smith Center for the Performing Arts, the Lou Ruvo Center for Brain Health, the Clark County Government Center, the Las Vegas Premium Outlets North, the Las Vegas Metropolitan Police Department Headquarters and the Las Vegas Medical District.

Segerblom said that if no other Democrat ran for governor of Nevada against incumbent Republican Brian Sandoval in the 2014 election, he would.

In 2021, Segerblom ran to succeed the retiring William McCurdy II as chair of the Nevada Democratic Party, having previously served as chair from 1990 to 1994. In the March election, which was conducted virtually, he was defeated by Clark County Democratic Party chair Judith Whitmer.

Personal life
Segerblom was given his nickname "Tick" from a bout of hiccups when he was a child.

References

External links
 

1948 births
Living people
21st-century American politicians
Clark County, Nevada commissioners
Democratic Party members of the Nevada Assembly
Democratic Party Nevada state senators
People from Boulder City, Nevada
Politicians from Carson City, Nevada
Politicians from Las Vegas
Pomona College alumni
University of Denver alumni